CATF may refer to:

China Air Task Force
Contemporary American Theater Festival